USS John H. Dalton (SSN-808) will be a nuclear-powered  for the United States Navy, the seventh of the Block V attack submarines and 35th overall of the class. She will be the first U.S. Naval vessel named for John Howard Dalton, the 70th Secretary of the Navy and a former submariner who, after graduating with distinction from the U.S. Naval Academy in 1964, served aboard the attack submarine  and the ballistic missile submarine . 

The submarine's name was announced on 28 February 2023 by Navy Secretary Carlos Del Toro at the Naval Academy in Annapolis, Maryland.

References
 

 

Virginia-class submarines
Submarines of the United States Navy
Proposed ships of the United States Navy